The 2011–12 Detroit Red Wings season was the 86th season for the National Hockey League (NHL) franchise that was established on September 25, 1926. The Red Wings finished the season with a 48–28–6 record and for the first time since 1990–91 season, the Red Wings did not finish first or second in their division, finishing third. Also, the Red Wings had their earliest playoff exit since 2006 against the Edmonton Oilers, losing to the Nashville Predators in five games.

Off-season
On July 19, 2011, goaltender Chris Osgood announced his retirement from the NHL after 17 seasons. Osgood won three Stanley Cups with the Red Wings and will remain with the Red Wings organization, working with Detroit's goaltending prospects.

Regular season
On February 12, against the Philadelphia Flyers, the Red Wings tied an NHL record of 20 consecutive home wins. The only two other teams to accomplish this feat was the 1930 Boston Bruins and the 1976 Philadelphia Flyers. On February 14, against the Dallas Stars, the Red Wings broke the NHL record of 20 consecutive home wins, becoming the first team to record 21 straight home wins. The streak was extended to 23 on February 19 with a win over the San Jose Sharks. The streak started on November 5, 2011, against the Anaheim Ducks. However, the streak would end at 23 games with a 4–3 shootout loss to the Vancouver Canucks on February 23, 2012.

The Red Wings tied the Tampa Bay Lightning for the fewest shorthanded goals scored during the regular season with two.

Standings

Divisional standings

Conference standings

Schedule and results

Regular season

Playoffs

Player statistics

Skaters
Note: GP = Games played; G = Goals; A = Assists; Pts = Points; +/− = Plus/minus; PIM = Penalty minutes

Goaltenders 
Note: GP = Games played; TOI = Time on ice (minutes); W = Wins; L = Losses; OT = Overtime losses; GA = Goals against; SO = Shutouts; Sv% = Save percentage; GAA = Goals against average

†Denotes player spent time with another team before joining Red Wings. Stats reflect time with the Red Wings only.
‡Traded mid-season
Bold/italics denotes franchise record

Awards and records

Awards

Records

Milestones

The Detroit Red Wings officially broke the NHL record for consecutive home games won, on February 14, 2012. They defeated the Dallas Stars by a score of 3–1, breaking the 1929–30 Boston Bruins and the 1975–76 Philadelphia Flyers previous record of 20 games. The streak ended at 23 wins after a shootout loss to the Vancouver Canucks on February 23, 2012.

Transactions
The Red Wings have been involved in the following transactions during the 2011–12 season.

Trades

Free agents signed

Free agents lost

Claimed via waivers

Lost via waivers

Lost via retirement

Lost via death

Player signings

Draft picks

See also 
 2011–12 NHL season

References

Detroit Red Wings seasons
Detroit Red Wings season, 2011-12
Detroit
Detroit Red
Detroit Red